Raorchestes bobingeri (Bob Inger's bush frog) is a species of frog in the family Rhacophoridae.
It is endemic to the Western Ghats, India.

Its natural habitat is subtropical or tropical moist montane forests.
It is threatened by habitat loss. This species is observed on vegetation ranging from short bushes to tall forest canopys from where the males vocalize.

References

External links

Endemic fauna of the Western Ghats
Frogs of India
bobingeri
Taxonomy articles created by Polbot
Amphibians described in 2005